Olori Aiyivieruewinoya "Ivie" Emiko-Atuwatse, known as Olori Atuwatse III (born 22 May 1986), is Queen of the Warri Kingdom, a lawyer, social entrepreneur and wife of Ogiame Atuwatse III, current ruler of the Kingdom of Warri, and the 21st Olu of Warri. She is also the daughter of Nigerian business magnate, investor and philanthropist Captain Hosa Wells Okunbo. After his coronation in August 2021, the Olu of Warri bestowed a new title on his wife, calling her Olori Atuwatse III, now her official title.

Early life 
Olori Atuwatse was born in Lagos and was educated in Nigeria and the United Kingdom. She received a Bachelor of Laws degree from the London School of Economics and was called to the Nigerian Bar in 2010.

Philanthropy 

Olori Atuwatse III has been involved in several endeavours targeting women and children, including the Captain Idahosa Wells Okunbo Stem Innovation Centre, which she established in honour of her father. She has also initiated several intervention programs for the poor in Delta State, including a 2022 visit to the Ureju Community, an oil rich slum suffering the effects of environmental degradation and Iyara, another slum community. Olori Atuwatse III is also an advocate for children’s rights, particularly the empowerment of female children. She has endowed hundreds of children with scholarships, including a 2022 scheme for 100 children from the Nana Model Girls College Warri, Warri, Delta State. Under her health initiatives, Olori Atuwatse III has promoted access to free healthcare, especially for the poor, and in December 2021, launched the Wuwu Ore medical and welfare outreach, focused on women, children and the elderly. A second edition of the program was held in Ugbolokposo Community, in the Delta state in April 2022.

Personal life 
Olori Atuwatse III married Ogiame Atuwatse III in November 2014. They have three children.

References 

21st-century Nigerian women
1986 births
Living people
Nigerian traditional rulers
Lawyers from Lagos
Alumni of the London School of Economics